The Esso Women's Nationals was the Canadian women's senior ice hockey championship from 1982 to 2008.  The winners of the event received the Abby Hoffman Cup. The second place team was awarded the Fran Rider Cup, while the third place was given the Maureen McTeer Trophy. Nine or ten teams (depending on the tournament) qualified for the event, with two from the province hosting the event.  The event was sponsored by Esso.

History 
Since the split between the National Women's Hockey League and the Western Women's Hockey League in 2004, this was the only event in the professional women's hockey calendar that saw teams from the two leagues play against each other.  Although an agreement between the NWHL and the WWHL was reached in 2006 to merge the two leagues (wherein the latter would be absorbed as a separate division of the former), difficulty in setting up the Nationals alongside an interlocking playoff format prevented the merger from taking place - the Nationals eventually would take place mere days after the WWHL playoffs and before the NWHL playoffs.

With the collapse of the NWHL soon after and the establishment of the Canadian Women's Hockey League in Eastern Canada, the Esso Nationals, which will also serve as a playoff of sorts between the WWHL and CWHL, received a format overhaul in 2008, in which the top two teams from the WWHL (representing British Columbia, Alberta, and Saskatchewan) and the top two teams from the CWHL (representing Ontario and Quebec) automatically qualified for the event.  Teams representing the provinces without teams in either league filled out the remainder of the field, due to Hockey Canada requirements that every province be represented.  The Abby Hoffman Cup was awarded to both the club pool and the team pool champions.  Similarly, the Fran Rider Cup and the Maureen McTeer Trophy (the trophies awarded for the silver and bronze medalists at the Esso Nationals) were awarded in both the club and team pool tournaments.

To level the playing field (which in recent years had been dominated by club teams) for 2008, the four club teams played in a separate tournament from the four all-star teams (and thus two championships were awarded at the Esso Nationals), with the intent that the club pool (with the Clarkson Cup as its championship) would be splintered off into its own tournament at some point in the future.  The 2008 tournament also saw the first American team to qualify, with the Minnesota Whitecaps joining the Calgary Oval X-Treme in representing the WWHL in the club pool.  The format was the same for both the club and team tournaments: after the four teams played a single round robin pool, the four teams were seeded based on their standings and played a single-elimination tournament for the championship.

This arrangement had lasted for only one year; in 2009, the dispute between Clarkson and the Clarkson Cup's artists was settled, and a new championship, the National Canadian Women's Hockey Championship, was created for the professional teams, under the same format.  However, this was not without cost as Hockey Canada elected to discontinue the Esso Women's Nationals in favour of the Esso Cup, a new national female midget 'AAA' championship.

List of Champions

Game details
On March 22, 1998, Dana Antal scored at 5:31 of a 10-minute overtime period on a pass from Jennifer Botterill as Team Alberta (represented by the Calgary Oval X-Treme) defeated Team Ontario (represented by the Beatrice Aeros) by a 3-2 mark to win the Esso Nationals.
The Calgary Oval X-Treme (Team Alberta) and the Brampton Thunder (Team Ontario) competed in the 2003 Esso Women's National Hockey Championship. Team Alberta won by a score of 6-3 in front of over 1,100 fans at Saskatchewan Place. Samantha Holmes scored twice while Colleen Sostorics and Delaney Collins each contributed two assists. Team Alberta outscored their opponents in the tournament 46 to 10. With the win, Team Alberta was awarded the Abby Hoffman Cup.

Awards and honors
2006 Top Forward: Jayna Hefford (Team Ontario)
2006 Top Goaltender: Charline Labonté (Team Quebec)
2006 Tournament MVP: Annie Durosiers (Team Quebec)
2007 Tournament MVP (Pool A): Hayley Wickenheiser (Team Alberta)
2007 Top Defender (Pool A): Cheryl Pounder (Team Ontario)
2007 Top goaltender (Pool A): Desirae Clark (Team BC)
2007 Top Forward (Pool A): Gina Kingsbury (Team Alberta)
2007 Tournament MVP (Pool B): Karen Thatcher (Team BC)
2007 Top Defender (Pool B): Melissa Coulombe (Team Manitoba)
2007 Top goaltender (Pool B): Kenzie Waterstreet (Team BC - Host Team) 
2007 Top Forward (Pool B): Karen Thatcher (Team BC)
2007 Mickey Walker – Most Sportsmanlike Player – Jennifer Sullivan (PEI)
2007 Most Sportsmanlike Team – New Brunswick

Players of the game
2003 Gold Medal Game, Dana Antal, Oval X-Treme (Team Alberta)
2003 Gold Medal Game, Jayna Hefford, Brampton Thunder (Team Ontario)
2006 Gold Medal Game, Kristie Zamora, Brampton Thunder (Team Ontario)
2006 Gold Medal Game, Charline Labonte, Montreal Axion (Team Quebec)

See also
Esso Cup

References

Women's ice hockey competitions in Canada